Hartigan is a surname. Notable people with the surname include:

 Bernie Hartigan (b. 1944), Irish hurler
 Bill Hartigan (b. 1934), Australian politician
 Brent Hartigan (b. 1985), Australian football player
 Chad Hartigan (b. 1982), Cyprus-born, Irish-American filmmaker and actor
 Charles Conway Hartigan (1882–1944), American Medal of Honor recipient
 David James Hartigan (1887–1952), Canadian politician
 Gerald Hartigan (1884–1955), South African cricketer
 Grace Hartigan (1922–2008), American painter
 Henry Hartigan (1826–1886), Irish Victoria Cross recipient
 James Hartigan (b. 1975), English journalist and broadcaster
 Joan Hartigan (1912–2000), Australian tennis player
 John Hartigan, fictional character
 John Patrick Hartigan (1887–1968), American jurist
 John Hartigan (media executive)  (born 1947), Australian journalist and media executive
 John Hartigan (rowing) (1940–2020), American coxswain
 Mark Hartigan (b. 1977), Canadian ice hockey player
 Mercy Hartigan, fictional character
 Neil Hartigan (b. 1938), American politician
 Pamela Hartigan (1948–2016), businesswoman
 Pat Hartigan (b. 1950), Irish hurler
 Pat Hartigan (actor) (1881–1951), American actor and director
 Patrick Joseph Hartigan (1878–1952), Australian priest, author and poet
 Roger Hartigan (1879–1958), Australian cricketer

Notes

References